Aureliane was a town of ancient Bithynia inhabited during Roman times. It was on the road an hour east of Nicaea.

Its site is located east of İznik in Asiatic Turkey.

References

Populated places in Bithynia
Former populated places in Turkey
History of Bursa Province
Roman towns and cities in Turkey